Ronald Alfred Vernieux (18 October 1910 – 25 May 1997) was an Indian sprinter. He competed in the 100 metres at the 1932 Summer Olympics. Vernieux finished sixth in the 1934 British Empire Games 4×110 yards relay (with Gyan Bhalla, Jehangir Khan and Niranjan Singh); in the 100 yards and 220 yards he was eliminated in the heats.

References

External links
 

1910 births
1997 deaths
Athletes (track and field) at the 1932 Summer Olympics
Indian male sprinters
Olympic athletes of India
Athletes (track and field) at the 1934 British Empire Games
Commonwealth Games competitors for India
Athletes from Kolkata
Anglo-Indian people
Indian emigrants to Australia
Australian people of Anglo-Indian descent